José Bernardo Laureiro Alves (born February 2, 1992), known as Bernardo Laureiro, is an Uruguayan footballer currently playing for Cerro Largo in the Uruguayan Segunda División.

International career
He has been capped by the Uruguay U-17 national team for the 2009 FIFA U-17 World Cup in Nigeria and for the 2009 South American Under-17 Football Championship where he scored a goal against Venezuela.

Notes

References

External links
 
 Bernardo Laureiro at playmakerstats.com (English version of ceroacero.es)
 

1992 births
Living people
People from Melo, Uruguay
Uruguayan footballers
Uruguayan expatriate footballers
Uruguay youth international footballers
Defensor Sporting players
Cerro Largo F.C. players
A.C. Barnechea footballers
C.D. Walter Ferretti players
Primera B de Chile players
Expatriate footballers in Chile
Expatriate footballers in Nicaragua
Association football midfielders
Uruguayan expatriate sportspeople in Nicaragua